Adrian Ward may refer to:

 Adrian Ward (American football) (born 1982), cornerback for the Minnesota Vikings and the New York Giants
 Adrian Ward (artist) (born 1976), software artist and musician